Below is a list of the records that the Sydney Roosters have achieved since 1908.

Sydney Roosters Win–loss record

Active Teams

Discontinued Teams

Individual records

Most First Grade Games

Most Points

Most Points in a Season

Most Points in a Game

Most Tries

Most Tries in a Season

Most Tries in a Match

Most Goals

Most Goals in a Season

Most Goals in a Match

Most Field Goals

Rothmans Medal winners

Dally M Medal winners

Most First Grade Games as Coach

Most Wins as Coach

Team Records

Biggest Wins vs Active Teams

Biggest Losses vs Active Teams

Biggest Wins vs Discontinued Teams

Biggest Losses vs Discontinued Teams

Longest Winning Streak

Longest Losing Streak

Attendance Records

Highest Home Attendances

Highest Finals Attendances

Highest Away Attendances

See also

References

External links

Records
National Rugby League lists
Sydney-sport-related lists